Jason Oakes may refer to:

 Jason Oakes (cricketer) (born 1995), South African cricketer
 Jason Oakes (rugby union) (born 1977), English rugby player